The 2021 Judo Grand Slam Tel Aviv was held at the Drive in Arena in Tel Aviv, Israel from 18 to 20 February 2021.

Medal summary

Men's events

Source Results

Women's events

Source Results

Medal table

Event videos
The event will air freely on the IJF YouTube channel.

References

External links
 

2021 IJF World Tour
2021 Judo Grand Slam
IJF World Tour Tel Aviv
Grand Slam 2021
Judo
Judo
Judo
Judo